Salvador Díaz Mirón (December 14, 1853 – June 12, 1928) was a Mexican poet. He was born in the port city of Veracruz. His early verse, written in a passionate, romantic style, was influenced by Lord Byron and Victor Hugo. His later verse was more classical in mode. His poem, A Gloria, was influential. His 1901 volume Lascas ("Chips from a Stone") established Diaz Mirón as a precursor of modernismo. After a long period of exile, he returned to Mexico and died in Veracruz on June 12, 1928.

Work
The Mexican Parnassus (1886)
Poetry (New York, 1895)
Poems (Paris, 1900)
Flakes (Xalapa, 1901 with several reprints)
Poems (1918)
Complete Poems (UNAM, with notes of Antonio Castro Leal, 1941)
Collection of poems (UNAM 1953)
Prosas (1954)

Notes

External links
Biography and Poems by Díaz Mirón (In Spanish)

1853 births
1928 deaths
Mexican male poets
19th-century Mexican writers
Members of the Mexican Academy of Language
Writers from Veracruz
People from Veracruz (city)
20th-century Mexican writers
20th-century Mexican male writers
19th-century male writers